US Créteil Handball is a French handball team based in Créteil, a suburb of Paris, that plays in the LNH Division 1.

Crest, colours, supporters

Naming history

Kit manufacturers

Kits

Results
LNH Division 1:
Gold: 1989
Silver: 1988, 1997, 2004
LNH Division 2:
Gold: 2011, 2014
Coupe de France:
Winners: 1989, 1997 
Finalists: 1988, 1993, 2003
Coupe de la Ligue:
Winners: 2003
Finalists: 2004, 2008
EHF Champions League: 
Semifinalists: 1990
EHF Cup Winners' Cup: 
Finalists: 1989
EHF Cup: 
Semifinalists: 2006
EHF Challenge Cup: 
Semifinalists: 2003
 Double
 Winners (1): 1988–89

European record

Former club members

Notable former players

  Joël Abati (1995–1997)
  Stéphane Cordinier (1989–1993)
  Hugo Descat (2007–2017)
  Yoann Gibelin (2017–2022)
  Benoît Henry (1999–2009)
  François-Xavier Houlet (1986–1990, 1994, 1996–1997)
  Erwan Siakam-Kadji (2014–2016)
  Guéric Kervadec (1994–1997, 2002–2010)
  Nicolas Lemonne (1998–2009)
  Patrick Lepetit (1994–1998)
  Frédéric Louis (1995–1998, 2000–2005)
  Pascal Mahé (1985–1992)
  Quentin Minel (2009–2016)
  Pierre Montorier (2011–2014)
  Olivier Nyokas (2009–2014)
  Frédéric Perez (1988–1992)
  Nedim Remili (2005–2016)
  Mickaël Robin (2016-2021)
  Philippe Schaaf (1989–1992)
  Boïba Sissoko (2002-2022)
  Denis Tristant (1988-1992)
  Belgacem Filah (2003-2004)
  Mohamed Mokrani (2015-2017)
  Salim Nedjel (2003-2004)
  Dejan Malinović (2014-2017)
  Muhamed Toromanović (2014-2018)
  Felipe Borges (2020-2021)
  Gustavo Rodrigues (2017-2019)
  Bruno Butorac (2021–)
  Dragan Jerković (2010–2013)
  Igor Kos (2006-2007)
  Venio Losert (2009-2010)
  Zlatko Saračević (1994-1995)
  Mate Šunjić (2013–2017)
  Rafael Baena González (2012–2014)
  Victor Alonso (2015–2018)
  Nerijus Atajevas (2006–2012)
  Yassine Idrissi (2008-2009)
  Pepi Manaskov (1991-1993)
  Borko Ristovski (2014-2015)
  Andrzej Tłuczyński (1984–1988)
  Alexandru Csepreghi (2014–2018)
  Eremia Pîrîianu (2005–2008)
  Gorazd Škof (2013)
  Mile Isaković (1988–1991)
  Uroš Mitrović (2009–2012)
  Dragan Počuča (2002–2004, 2013–2016)
  Ivan Stanković (2011–2014)
  Issam Tej (2017–2018)

Former coaches

External links

Creteil
Créteil
Sport in Val-de-Marne